Paraskevas Paiteris (born 30 June 1970) is a Greek former football defender.

References

1970 births
Living people
Greek footballers
Kastoria F.C. players
Panionios F.C. players
Kallithea F.C. players
Leonidio F.C. players
Ethnikos Piraeus F.C. players
Koropi F.C. players
Super League Greece players
Association football defenders